Ramesh Krishnan defeated Dave Siegler in the final, 6–0, 6–2 to win the boys' singles tennis title at the 1979 Wimbledon Championships.

Seeds

  Ramesh Krishnan (champion)
  Dave Siegler (final)
  Hans Simonsson (semifinals)
  Ben Testerman (quarterfinals)
  Stefan Svensson (semifinals)
  Scott Davis (first round)
  Glenn Michibata (quarterfinals)
  Greg Whitecross (third round)

Draw

Finals

Top half

Section 1

Section 2

Bottom half

Section 3

Section 4

References

External links

Boys' Singles
Wimbledon Championship by year – Boys' singles